Daisy bush can be:
 Species of the genus Olearia
 The New Zealand native Brachyglottis greyi 
Gamolepis chrysanthemoides also known as African bush daisy

References